Louis Schmit (18 February 1908 – 25 November 2002) was a Luxembourgian middle-distance runner. He competed in the men's 800 metres at the 1928 Summer Olympics.

References

1908 births
2002 deaths
Athletes (track and field) at the 1928 Summer Olympics
Luxembourgian male middle-distance runners
Olympic athletes of Luxembourg
Sportspeople from Luxembourg City